Jason Peterson Bennett (born October 8, 1982) in Mount Standfast, Saint James, Barbados is a West Indian first-class cricketer, who took 106 wickets in his first class career. As a cricketer Bennett featured as a right arm fast medium pacer for Barbados, Combined Campuses and Colleges together with West Indies B.

References

1982 births
Living people
Barbadian cricketers
Barbados cricketers
Combined Campuses and Colleges cricketers
People from Saint James, Barbados
West Indies B cricketers